Glen is a surname. Notable people with the surname include:

Abigail Glen (born 2001), English cricketer
Alec Glen, Scottish footballer
Alex Glen (1878–1916), Scottish footballer
Archie Glen (1929–1998), Scottish international football player
Cornell Glen (born 1980), Trinidadian international football (soccer) player
Davie Glen (1881–1917), Scottish footballer
Gary Glen (born 1990), Scottish football player
Georgie Glen, Scottish actress
Iain Glen (born 1961), Scottish actor
James Allison Glen (1877–1950), Canadian politician
John Glen (director) (born 1932), English film director and editor
John Glen (mayor) (1809–1895), mayor of Atlanta
John Glen (politician) (born 1974), UK Conservative politician
Marla Glen (born 1960), American jazz singer
Robert Glen (born 1875), Scottish international football player
Sandy Glen (1912–2004), Scottish explorer
William Glen (geologist) (born 1932), American geologist and historian
William Glen (poet) (1789–1826), Scottish poet

See also
 Glen (disambiguation)
 Glen (given name)
 Glenn (name)